Rosenheim may refer to:

Rosenheim, a city in Bavaria, Germany
Rosenheim station, a railway station in the city
Rosenheim, Rhineland-Palatinate, a municipality in the district of Altenkirchen, Germany
Rosenheim (district), in Bavaria, Germany
Rosenheim (electoral district), which elects a representative to the Bundestag in Germany
Rosenheim, Alberta, a community in Municipal District of Provost No. 52, Alberta, Canada